Miraculum is a Canadian drama film, directed by Daniel Grou and released on February 28, 2014.

Synopsis
The film follows the development of different stories at the same time. Simon (played by Gabriel Sabourin) finally returns to his home country after spending years abroad. He does so illegally entering with drugs, that he believes will help him fix a mistake he committed a while ago. Raymond (played by Julien Poulin) plans a trip with his mistress, she however refuses to leave her husband. Martin (played by Robin Aubert) lies to his wife (played by Anne Dorval) on the eve of their trip and goes spend the night in a casino. Lastly, it depict the soul tearing dilemma Étienne (Xavier Dolan) faces as a Jéhovah's witness living with leukemia. His fiancée, who also shares his faith, deals with a similar situation went she needs to attend to a plane crash survivor.

Cast

 Marilyn Castonguay : Julie
 Gabriel Sabourin : Simon
 Robin Aubert : Martin
 Xavier Dolan : Étienne
 Julien Poulin : Raymond
 Louise Turcot : Louise
 Anne Dorval : Évelyne
 Gilbert Sicotte : Louise's husband

Accolades
The film received two Jutra Award nominations at the 17th Jutra Awards in 2015, for Best Supporting Actor (Aubert) and Best Hair (Ann-Louise Landry).

It was shortlisted for the Prix collégial du cinéma québécois in 2015.

References

External links

2014 films
Canadian drama films
Films directed by Daniel Grou
Films shot in Quebec
French-language Canadian films
2010s Canadian films